Nirupam Sen (born 28 February 1990) is an Indian cricketer who plays for Tripura. He made his Twenty20 debut on 2 January 2016 in the 2015–16 Syed Mushtaq Ali Trophy. He made his first-class debut for Tripura in the 2018–19 Ranji Trophy on 30 December 2018.

References

External links
 

1990 births
Living people
Indian cricketers
Tripura cricketers
Cricketers from Tripura